Commodore Melanie Suzanne "Mel" Robinson,  is a British senior Royal Naval Reserve officer. Since February 2020, she has been Commander of Maritime Reserves.

Naval career
Robinson has degrees from Cardiff University and the Open University. She joined the Royal Navy in 1993. As commander of the Cardiff University Royal Naval Unit (now Wales URNU) and its training ship , she was in the first batch of women to command a Royal Navy patrol vessel. She transferred to the Royal Naval Reserve with the rank of commander in November 2015. She was promoted to commodore on 4 February 2020, and is one of four women to currently hold that rank.

Robinson was appointed a Commander of the Order of the British Empire in the 2022 Birthday Honours.

Personal life
Robinson is married to Vice Admiral Guy Robinson, a fellow Royal Navy officer who has been serving with NATO as Chief of Staff to Supreme Allied Commander Transformation since 2021. They have two children.

See also
 List of senior female officers of the British Armed Forces

References

20th-century Royal Navy personnel
21st-century Royal Navy personnel
Alumni of Cardiff University
Alumni of the Open University
Commanders of the Order of the British Empire
Living people
Royal Naval Reserve personnel
Royal Navy commodores
Women in the Royal Navy
Year of birth missing (living people)